The International Stele Always Remember is an outdoor HIV/AIDS memorial in Berlin, Germany.

See also

 HIV/AIDS in Europe

References

HIV/AIDS
Monuments and memorials in Berlin
Steles